The Owl in the Attic and Other Perplexities is a book by James Thurber first published in 1931 by Harper and Brothers. It collects a number of short humorous pieces, most of which had appeared in The New Yorker, and an introduction by E. B. White.

Contents

Part One: Mr and Mrs Monroe
A number of short stories featuring the Mr and Mrs Monroe and which contain many autobiographical elements

Part Two: The Pet Department
"Inspired by the daily pet column in the New York Evening Post" and consisting of a number of short question and answers, each illustrated by a Thurber drawing.

Part Three: Ladies and Gentlemen's Guide to Modern English Usage
"Inspired by Mr. H. W. Fowler's A Dictionary of Modern English Usage"

References

1931 books
Works by James Thurber
Harper & Brothers books